"Stop! Dimentica" is a song by Italian pop singer, Tiziano Ferro from his third studio album, Nessuno è solo. It was released as the album's lead single in the Italy as a digital download on 26 May 2006. The song was written by Ferro and produced by Michele Canova.

It received favourable reviews from music critics, who noted that it was a catchy radio hit. Commercially, the song was a success, topping the charts in Italy and Austria, while it reached the top-ten in Spain and Switzerland.

The song's music video was recorded in Bulgaria and directed by Antti Jokinen. The model Victoria Dzhumparova collaborated on video.

Track listing
 Stop! Dimentica
 Stop! Dimentica (Kelly Osbourne One Word Remix)
 Stop! Dimentica (Melodica Dimentica Remix)
 Stop! Dimentica (Melodica Edit Remix)
 Stop! Olvidate
 Stop! Dimentica (Acoustic Version) - exclusive for iTunes Store

Charts

Peak positions

Year-end charts

Certifications and sales

References

External links

2006 singles
Italian-language songs
Number-one singles in Italy
Number-one singles in Austria
Tiziano Ferro songs
Songs written by Tiziano Ferro
2006 songs
EMI Records singles